The Second Sumatran expedition was a punitive expedition by the United States Navy against inhabitants of the island of Sumatra. After Malay warriors or pirates had massacred the crew of the American merchant ship Eclipse, an expedition of two American warships landed a force that defeated the Malays in two short engagements.

Background

In August 1838, the American trading vessel Eclipse was visiting the village of Terbangan, on South Aceh, when 24 Malays approached. The ship's second mate allowed the Malays to board after they relieved themselves of their weapons. A few moments later the Americans returned the Malays their weapons as a sign of friendship. The Malays, now rearmed with knives and other bladed weapons, attacked the crew. First they killed the second mate and then one by one the remaining men. Some of the American sailors jumped overboard but the Malays hunted them down and killed them. This was the second of such incidents. The massacre of the crew of the merchant ship Friendship by Malays had given rise to the first Sumatran expedition in 1832. News of the massacre reached Commodore George C. Read in December 1838 while he was sailing off Ceylon in command of the East India Squadron. Immediately Commodore Read in the frigate  set sail southeast for Sumatra, together with the frigate . Columbia and John Adams were in the process of circumnavigating the globe in conjunction with, though not part of, the United States Exploring Expedition of 1838 to 1842. Coincidentally, the expedition to Sumatra required no detour. Columbia held almost 500 men on average and mounted 50 guns during the expedition. John Adams carried about 220 men and officers with 30 guns.

Expedition

The expedition arrived off southern Sumatra on 1 January 1839. The two American vessels first headed for Quallah Battoo. Once they had arrived, the two U.S. Navy vessels formed a line of battle just in range of five earth and wooden forts that protected the village and opened fire. Over an hour later all of the forts were destroyed or in shambles. The chief of the village surrendered and agreed never again to attack American ships. With this Commodore Read set sail for Muckie, the next American objective. Columbia and John Adams arrived off Muckie the following day. The Americans landed a force of 360 officers, marines and sailors, all under the command of Commander T.W. Wyman of the Navy. Wyman's men attacked Muckie, while Columbia and John Adams provided covering fire with their cannon. Although most of the inhabitants fled their village upon the outbreak of fighting, some of the Malay men attempted to resist the attack but were overwhelmed. Within a short time, Muckie was in flames. The landing party then returned to their ships and sailed away. The punitive expedition ended after the Muckie engagement, and Commodore Read continued his cruise around the world. The second Sumatran expedition achieved what the first expedition had not. Casualties are absent from records.

See also
General Sherman incident

References

Earl, George S. W. (1850). "On The Leading Characteristics of the Papuan, Australian and Malay-Polynesian Nations". Journal of the Indian Archipelago and Eastern Asia JIAEA, page 119
Murrell, William Meacham, Cruise of the Frigate Columbia Around The World Under The Command of Commodore George C. Read. Benjamin B. Mussey, Boston, Mass, (1840)

Battles involving the United States
Aceh
Naval battles involving the United States
Naval battles involving the Netherlands
United States Marine Corps in the 18th and 19th centuries
Military history of Indonesia
Military history of the Netherlands
History of Sumatra
Punitive expeditions of the United States
Punitive expeditions of the Netherlands
Conflicts in 1838
Conflicts in 1839
1838 in Southeast Asia
1839 in Southeast Asia
1838 in the Dutch East Indies
1839 in the Dutch East Indies
December 1838 events
January 1839 events